Will Spencer may refer to:

 Will Spencer (The Bold and the Beautiful)
 Will Spencer (rugby union) (born 1992), English rugby union player